Groote Eylandt (Anindilyakwa: Ayangkidarrba meaning "island" ) is the largest island in the Gulf of Carpentaria and the fourth largest island in Australia. It was named by the explorer Abel Tasman in 1644 and is Dutch for "Large Island" in archaic spelling. The modern Dutch spelling is Groot Eiland.

The original inhabitants of Groote Eylandt are the Anindilyakwa, an Aboriginal Australian people, who speak the Anindilyakwa language (also known as Amamalya Ayakwa). They consist of 14 clan groups which make up the two moieties on the island. The clans maintain their traditions and have strong ties with the people in the community of Numbulwar and on Bickerton Island. The island's population was 2,811 in the 2016 census.

There are four communities on Groote Eylandt. The mining company GEMCO established the township of Alyangula for its workers. The three main Aboriginal communities are Angurugu and Umbakumba, and Milyakburra on Bickerton Island. There are also a number of outstations on the island.

The Anindilyakwa Land Council is one of four land councils in the Northern Territory. It is a representative body with statutory authority under the Aboriginal Land Rights (Northern Territory) Act 1976 and has responsibilities under the Native Title Act 1993 and the Pastoral Land Act 1992.

Geography 

Politics and Administration

Electorates 
Groote Eylandt is part of the federal electorate of Lingiari, for which the current member is Marion Scrymgour, who replaced the inaugural member Warren Snowdon at the 2022 Australian federal election. The island is within the Northern Territory electoral division of Arnhem. The current member for Arnhem is Labor Party member Selena Uibo, whose mother is a Nunggubuyu and Anindilyakwa woman.

Local government 
With Bickerton Island and a few smaller satellite islands, Groote Eylandt forms Anindilyakwa Ward of East Arnhem Region. It contains the communities of Angurugu, Alyangula, Umbakumba, Yadagba District, Uburamudja District and Sandy Hill (Groote Eylandt) and Milyakburra District (Bickerton Island).

Outside the local government, subdivision is the mining company GEMCO town of Alyangula, an unincorporated territory within the Northern Region of Northern Territory.

Environment
The whole of Groote Eylandt and its surrounding waters lie within the Anindilyakwa Indigenous Protected Area. BirdLife International has classified an unnamed islet off the north-eastern coast as an important bird area because of its global importance as a roseate tern breeding site.

Groote Eylandt has a variety of habitats: dense stands on monsoon forests rising behind coastal sand dunes, alternating with mangrove and mudflats. Sandstone outcrops and laterite provide excellent niches for shellfish.

Fauna 
The island hosts 27 species of native mammal, making it the third most mammal diverse Australian island after Melville Island and Tasmania.

Fishing 
Until recently, the island had been open to the public only with permission, and the local Aboriginal Land Council did not encourage tourism. There is now a resort-style hotel on the island, and visitors are welcome. The island is becoming renowned for its fine Aboriginal rock art sites, arts and crafts and outstanding sport-fishing, including sailfish, marlin, tuna, Spanish mackerel, giant trevally, queenfish, and coral trout.

History

Traditional Owners 
The traditional owners of Groote Eylandt, the Anindilyakwa people, have 14 clan groups, which make up the two moieties on Groote Eylandt. The Anindilyakwa people have inhabited the island for thousands of years. The clans maintain their traditions and have strong ties with the people in the community of Numbulwar and on Bickerton Island.

In 1856, the Jurambunga tribe, a local aboriginal conglomerate would regularly pass the island.

Macassan Traders 
There had been regular contact between local Aboriginal people and Macassan traders who would visit the area searching for trepang from around the early to mid-1700s. They introduced culinary delights such as tamarinds, chilli and beer. The trade continued until the Australian Government introduced the White Australia Policy in 1906.

There is still evidence of the Macassans, such as the wild tamarind trees, which the traders introduced to the area. Some Groote Eylandt settlements, such as Umbakumba, can trace their names back to Macassan origin.

Machado-Joseph Disease (MJD) 
The first recorded European sighting of Groote Eylandt was in 1623, by the Dutch ship Arnhem, under Willem van Coolsteerdt. However, the relative prevalence of the hereditary Machado-Joseph Disease (MJD) in the Groote Eylandt community (a condition otherwise mainly found in the Azores) was previously suggested as evidence of early contact with Portuguese sailors. (Contact with Chinese traders has also been suggested as a cause.) Recent genetic studies showed that the Groote Eylandt families with MJD shared a haplogroup with some families from Taiwanese, Indian, and Japanese families.

European Colonisation

Church Mission Society 
The first European settlement on the island was a Christian mission established by the Church Missionary Society at Emerald River in 1921. In 1943, after a cyclone swept through the mission, CMS decided to move the settlement south of the Angurugu River. The local Anindilyakwa people called the chosen location "Mungwardinamanja". However, as it was difficult for the European missionaries to pronounce, the local Anindilyakwa men guiding them chose the name of the Angurugu River mouth "Angurrkwa", which was later Anglicised to Angurugu.

Umbakumba 
Mr Fred H. Gray, a pearl and trepang trader, established the Umbakumba Native Settlement on an old Macassan trading post in 1938. The place-name itself Umbakumba comes from the Malay word ombak-ombak, which means ‘lapping of waves’. He used the settlement as a base for trepanging and employed many of the Aboriginal locals during the 20s and 30s.

World War II 
During World War II, in 1943, the mission moved to Angurugu, as the RAAF required the use of the mission's airstrip: the ruins of the RAAF base are still evident today. Qantas used the island as a flying boat base.

Following the Aboriginal Land Rights (Northern Territory) Act 1976, Groote Eylandt was converted to Aboriginal freehold title land. In 1979, control of the island was transferred to the local Aboriginal Town Council.

Mining 
The majority of Australia's manganese reserves are located on the western side of Groote Eylandt. Special mining leases were granted to the Groote Eylandt Mining Company (GEMCO), a wholly-owned subsidiary of the BHP but has become a part of South32 since 18 May 2015.

GEMCO has been operating a large manganese mine near the community of Angurugu since the 25th July 1964. The mine produces more than 3.8 million tonnes annually – about a quarter of the world's total. Mining rights are renewed every 21 years, with operations expected to continue until 2027.

Groote Eylandt Mining Company (GEMCO) established the town of Alyangula as the residence for the mining company workers in the late 1960s.

Present-day 
On May 20, 2008, the federal government signed a deal with local Aboriginal people from Groote Eylandt to lease land to the government for 40 years. In return, the government will spend money in the community to improve housing, education, and health in the area.

Notable people
 Donald Thomson (1901–1970), Australian anthropologist and biologist.
David Warren (1925–2010), inventor of the flight data recorder, born on Groote Eylandt.
 Nick Kenny (1982–), former Brisbane Broncos rugby league player who moved to Groote Eylandt.
 Norman Tindale (1900–1993), Australian anthropologist, archaeologist, entomologist and ethnologist.
 Emily Wurramara, singer-songwriter, born on the island.
 Kaye Aldenhoven, a poet who lived and taught on the island

See also 
Groote Eylandt Airport
List of islands of Australia

References

External links 
Alyangula Area School
Alyangula Area School
Angurugu Community Government Council site
East Arnhem Regional Council
Eylandt Echo 
GEMCO – The Groote Eylandt mining company
GEMCO publication with map
Fishing on Groote Eylandt

 
Islands of the Northern Territory
Australian Aboriginal freehold title
Maritime history of the Dutch East India Company
Unincorporated areas of the Northern Territory
Arnhem Land tropical savanna
IBRA subregions